Deliktaş is a village in Dikili district of İzmir Province, Turkey. It is situated in the forests between Dikili and Çandarlı. The population of Deliklitaş is 1,599 as of 2011. The name of the village ("bored stone") refers to a 150 meter high boulder in the village. The village was founded in the 14th century during the Karesi Beylik era. The main economic activity is agriculture. Gumbo and olive are among the crops of the village. Some village residents work in transportation between İzmir and Dikili.

References

External links
For images

Villages in Dikili District